Alireza Motevaseli (Persian علیرضا متوسلی born 9 February 1992) is an Iranian musician.

Early life 
He was born in Tehran, Iran and earned a Music M.A. from Art University of Tehran as well as a B.A Orchestral conducting. He is also a composer, bassoonist and pianist.

He began studying music by playing bassoon in 2002 at the Television & Radio of Islamic republic of Iran (IRIB) Music School. He studied bassoon performance with masters such as  Terry B. Ewell (US),Alireza Sheibani and Taghi Zarrabi,.

Career 

After graduating from music school, he worked with some of the best known orchestras in Iran such as Tehran Symphony Orchestra, Iran National Orchestra, IRIB Symphony Orchestra, and many others.

As a bassoon soloist with Maestro Shahrdad Rohani and the Tehran Symphony Orchestra, he performed Sinfonia Concertante K297b from W.A.Mozart at Vahdat Hall.

In late 2016, Motevaseli started to translate a series of videos about bassoon education into Persian.

Bassoon playing 

He worked with Tehran Symphony Orchestra as principal bassoonist, led by Shahrdad Rouhani, Riccardo Muti, Alexander Rahbari, Alexander Rudin, Mark Stivenson, Nasir Heidarian, Nader Mashayekhi, Nader MortezaPour, Orwell Erdinç and Domina Jurana. and also had a collaboration with Mediant Trio led by Alvin Avanessian, as well as with other orchestra, including:

IRIB Symphony Orchestra, led by the late Mohammad Biglari Pour.

The Parsian orchestra led by Aidin men

Tehran Chamber Orchestra, led by Nader Mashayekhi.

Municipal Philharmonic Orchestra, led by Mohammad Hossein Hamidi.

Rudaki Orchestra, led by (Nader Abbassi _Arash Amini).

Iran Philharmonic Orchestra and Chorus under Alireza Shafaghi Nezhad.

Composer 
Motevaseli won First Prize of "Renaissance" Gyumri International Music Festival 2017 from the ministry of Culture of Armenia &  Municipality of Yerevan and the jury from Komitas State Conservatory of Yerevan.

By the decision of the board chair of Seattle Symphony for supporting the 7 countries whose citizens were banned from traveling to the US, a performance was held to support those countries. Motevaseli participated on this concert as an Iranian composer and was the youngest composer to be selected. The concert opened with his composition Fantasia for Santoor and Accordion.

His Fantasia has been acknowledged and performed by Seattle Symphony to celebrate Asia Composition competition on January

28th, 2016. At Fadjr International Music festival he won first prize of the Subjective Music Composition.

References

Living people
1992 births
Iranian composers
Iranian contemporary artists